Henry Catchpole (fl. 1390) of Hereford, was an English politician.

Career
He may have been the son of the earlier MP, Henry Catchpole.

Career
He was a Member (MP) of the Parliament of England for Hereford in November 1390.

References

Year of birth missing
Year of death missing
English MPs November 1390
14th-century English politicians
People from Hereford